Charles IX may refer to:

 Charles IX of France (1550–1574)
 Charles IX of Sweden (1550–1611)

See also
 King Charles (disambiguation)
 Charles